Voices Within: The Lives of Truddi Chase is an ABC-Network miniseries based on When Rabbit Howls, the autobiography of Truddi Chase, a woman who was diagnosed with dissociative identity disorder who allegedly had 92 separate personalities. The four-hour miniseries, which was directed by Lamont Johnson stars Emmy winner Shelley Long as Truddi Chase. Tom Conti co-stars as her doctor.  The miniseries aired on May 20 and 21, 1990 and Chase worked closely with screenwriter E. Jack Neuman to assure her autobiography was adapted accurately.  Voices Within also exists as a 1-hour 46 minute version.

Plot
Truddi Chase phones her therapist to tell him she intends to travel to upstate New York to kill her stepfather. During her plane ride to New York, she flashes back to her traumatic childhood, which was filled with childhood sexual abuse suffered at the hands of her stepfather. To cope with the trauma, she develops dissociative identity disorder, manifesting approximately 90 split personalities over the course of her life, whom she refers to collectively as "The Troops".

As a young woman, Truddi marries a man named Norman, but their marriage is rocky as a result of Truddi's psychological issues. Her condition worsens when they have a daughter, Paige, resulting in the breakdown of her marriage. Truddi seeks assistance, eventually meeting Dr. Stanley Phillips, who seeks to integrate Truddi's numerous personalities. Eventually Truddi decides to confront her stepfather in person.

Cast
Shelley Long as Truddi Chase 
Tom Conti as Dr. Stanley Phillips 
Tiffany Ballenger as Truddi Chase at 8 
Jon Beshara as Police 
Val Bettin as Playwright 
Kelly Brookman as Page De Roin at 8 
Irina Cashen as Truddi Chase at 6 
Carl Ciarfalio as Colin 
Marian Collier as Operator 
Frank Converse as Peter Morgan 
Robert Costanzo as Fred Zarr  
Manuel DePina as Barkeep 
Brendan Dillon as Shannon 
Dale Dunham as Manager 
Susan Eisenberg as Stewardess 
David Fox-Brenton as Dr. Modarelli
Alan Fudge as Albert Johnson 
Nancy Gormley as Airport 
John Hancock as Soloman 
Christine Healy as Sharon Barnes 
Miriam Johnson as Page De Roin at 15 
Jessie Jones as Scrub Nurse 
Guido Koock   
Melinda Kordich as Teacher 
Bennett Liss as Angry 
Ernie Lively as Paul
Joe Minjares as Mr. DiCola
Melinda Peterson as Nurse Daphne 
Steven M. Porter as Hayes 
Jamie Rose as Truddi's Mother 
John Rubinstein as Norman De Roin 
Benjamin L. Scott as Harry Barnes (as Ben Scott) 
Nicholas Scott as Danny 
Wesley A. Starr as Wedding Minister 
Marsha Van Winkle as Doris 
Alisha Waite as Annie 
Lisa Watson as Page De Roin at 12 
Stephanie Watson as Page De Roin at 10 
Bruce Westphal as Funeral Minister 
J.D. Yarbrough as Client

References

External links

Films shot in Minnesota
1990 drama films
1990 films
Films set in Minnesota
Films shot in California
ABC Movie of the Week
Films based on biographies
Films about psychiatry
Films based on non-fiction books
Films about child sexual abuse
Films scored by Charles Fox